, is a 2002 Japanese film directed by Shinichi Sawai, starring Hello! Project Kids, Morning Musume, and Maki Goto. The film was given a limited screening on December 14, 2002, where it was screened as a double-feature with Mini-Moni the Movie: Okashi na Daibōken!, a film starring other Hello! Project members.

Plot
Angry at her parents' decision to divorce, Mao Morishita decides to live with her grandfather in the countryside of Gunma Prefecture. Upon settling in her new school, Mao is bullied by Rena and her friends, while her aunt and uncle find her a burden. Meanwhile, Mao's classmate, Chika Nomura, finds an abandoned shiba inu puppy in the river, but because her apartment complex does not allow its tenants to keep pets, she decides to take care of him in secret and names him Dan. One day, Mao catches Chika shoplifting a carton of milk for Dan, but she offers to pay for it. While feeding Dan, Mao and Chika learn that Dan is blind and cannot survive on his own.

Yayoi, a convenience store worker, finds Chika taking care of Dan and warns her to be careful about getting caught by Tsuneo, her father and the leader of the neighborhood council. Mao and Chika leave Dan at a temple for its god to decide his owner, but Chika decides to go back for him. The girls continue to take care of Dan until he is discovered by Tsuneo. Tsuneo gives Chika one day to find a new owner, otherwise he will have Dan euthanized. With Yayoi and Ms. Nishida's help, Saki Ohkubo's uncle offers to take him in. However, Chika has grown so fond of Dan that she walks to Tochigi Prefecture by herself just to visit him, and when Mao realizes the two are inseparable, she convinces Saki's uncle to let them take him back. After apologizing to Saki, Mao vows that she will try to convince Tsuneo herself.

Mao and Yayoi persuade Tsuneo to let them keep Dan at the apartment complex, and he finally relents, adopting him. With help from their friends, Mao, Chika, and Tsuneo begin building a doghouse for Dan at a nearby park, but unfortunately, they are met with protest from the elderly tenants from the apartment complex, who object to keeping Dan. Mao stands up to the group's leader, stating that they should be able to help Dan much like how other dogs help blind humans. With support from the other neighbors, the tenants relent and help build Dan's doghouse.

Several days later, Mao is now friends with the girls at her school, including Rena. After school, Wakako comes to visit and tells Mao that the divorce has been finalized. Mao, however, tells her that she has decided to live with her father in Toyama Prefecture after reading his letter, and the two promise each other that they will always be family despite living apart. Mao pays a final visit to Chika and Dan, bidding them farewell. When she and her father leave on the bus as they move out, Mao sees all of the friends she made at Gunma Prefecture sending her off, and she says goodbye to them.

Cast

Soundtrack

 was released February 14, 2003 under the Zetima label. The film's theme song, "Ganbacchae!", was performed by Morning Musume, Hello! Project Kids, and Maki Goto. It was released separately as a DVD single on January 29, 2003, as a double A-side with "Hey! Mirai" by Morning Musume.

Awards and accolades

Adaptations

Manga
A manga adaptation written and illustrated by Marimo Shirozawa was serialized in Nakayoshi in 2002. The chapters were later released in one bound volume by Kodansha under the Kodansha Comics Nakayoshi imprint.

References

External links
 

2002 films
2002 manga
2000s Japanese films
Hello! Project
2000s Japanese-language films
Kodansha manga